80° Below '82 is an album by the improvisational collective Air featuring Henry Threadgill, Steve McCall and Fred Hopkins recorded in 1982 for the Antilles label.

Reception
The Allmusic review by Scott Yanow awarded the album 3 stars, stating, "This blues-oriented set is more accessible than many of Air's previous recordings without watering down the explorative nature of this always-interesting group". The Rolling Stone Jazz Record Guide said it "captures the telepathic agreement of Air's members in full glory".

Track listing
All compositions by Henry Threadgill except where noted.
 "Chicago Breakdown" (Jelly Roll Morton) – 7:58
 "The Traveller" – 9:28
 "80° Below '82" – 8:02
 "Do Tell" – 9:50

Personnel
Henry Threadgill – alto saxophone
Fred Hopkins – bass
Steve McCall – trap drums

References

1982 albums
Air (free jazz trio) albums
Antilles Records albums